The 37th Luna Awards ceremony, presented by the Film Academy of the Philippines (FAP), honored the best Filipino films of 2018. It took place on November 30, 2019, at the Maybank Performing Arts Theater in Taguig, Philippines.

Winners and nominees

Awards 
Winners are listed first, highlighted in boldface.

Special Awards 
The following honorary awards were also awarded.

 Fernando Poe, Jr. (FPJ) Lifetime Achievement Award – Lily Monteverde
 Manuel de Leon Award for Exemplary Achievements – Nova Villa
 Lamberto Avellana Memorial Award – Wenn Deramas, Soxie Topacio

References 

Luna Awards
2018 film awards